Wikidata is a collaboratively edited multilingual knowledge graph hosted by the Wikimedia Foundation. It is a common source of open data that Wikimedia projects such as Wikipedia, and anyone else, can use under the CC0 public domain license. Wikidata is a wiki powered by the software MediaWiki, and is also powered by the set of knowledge graph MediaWiki extensions known as Wikibase.

Concept 

Wikidata is a document-oriented database, focused on items, which represent any kind of topic, concept, or object. Each item is allocated a unique, persistent identifier, a positive integer prefixed with the upper-case letter Q, known as a "QID". This enables the basic information required to identify the topic that the item covers to be translated without favouring any language.

Item labels need not be unique. However, the combination of a label and its description must be unique. To avoid ambiguity, an item's unique identifier (QID) is therefore linked to this combination.

Main parts 

Fundamentally, an item consists of:

 Obligatorily, an identifier (the QID), related to a label and a description.
 Optionally, multiple aliases and some number of statements (and their properties and values).

Statements 

Statements are how any information known about an item is recorded in Wikidata. Formally, they consist of key–value pairs, which match a property (such as "author", or "publication date") with one or more entity values (such as "Sir Arthur Conan Doyle" or "1902"). For example, the informal English statement "milk is white" would be encoded by a statement pairing the property  with the value  under the item .

Statements may map a property to more than one value. For example, the "occupation" property for Marie Curie could be linked with the values "physicist" and "chemist", to reflect the fact that she engaged in both occupations.

Values may take on many types including other Wikidata items, strings, numbers, or media files. Properties prescribe what types of values they may be paired with. For example, the property  may only be paired with values of type "URL".

Optionally, qualifiers can be used to refine the meaning of a statement by providing additional information. For example, a "population" statement could be modified with a qualifier such as "point in time (P585): 2011" (as its own key-value pair). Values in the statements may also be annotated with references, pointing to a source backing up the statement's content. As with statements, all qualifiers and references are property–value pairs.

Properties 

Each property has a numeric identifier prefixed with a capital P and a page on Wikidata with optional label, description, aliases, and statements.

Properties may also define more complex rules about their intended usage, termed constraints. For example, the  property includes a "single value constraint", reflecting the reality that (typically) territories have only one capital city. Constraints are treated as testing alerts and hints, rather than inviolable rules.

Before a new property is created, it needs to undergo a discussion process.

Lexemes 
In linguistics, a lexeme is a unit of lexical meaning. Similarly, Wikidata's lexemes are items with a structure that makes them more suitable to store lexicographical data. Besides storing the language to which the lexeme refers, they have a section for forms and a section for senses.

EntitySchemas 
In January 2019 development started of a new extension for MediaWiki to enable storing Shape Expressions in a separate namespace.

This extension has since been installed on Wikidata and enables contributors to use 
Shape Expressions for validating and describing Resource Description Framework data in items and lexemes. Any item or lexeme on Wikidata can be validated against an Entity Schema, and this makes it an important tool for quality assurance.

Development 
The creation of the project was funded by donations from the Allen Institute for Artificial Intelligence, the Gordon and Betty Moore Foundation, and Google, Inc., totaling €1.3 million. The development of the project is mainly driven by Wikimedia Deutschland under the management of Lydia Pintscher, and was originally split into three phases:
 Centralising interlanguage links – links between Wikipedia articles about the same topic in different languages.
 Providing a central place for infobox data for all Wikipedias.
 Creating and updating list articles based on data in Wikidata and linking to other Wikimedia sister projects, including Meta-Wiki and the own Wikidata (interwikilinks).

Initial rollout 

Wikidata was launched on 29 October 2012 and was the first new project of the Wikimedia Foundation since 2006. At this time, only the centralization of language links was available. This enabled items to be created and filled with basic information: a label – a name or title, aliases – alternative terms for the label, a description, and links to articles about the topic in all the various language editions of Wikipedia (interwikipedia links).

Historically, a Wikipedia article would include a list of interlanguage links (links to articles on the same topic in other editions of Wikipedia, if they existed). Wikidata was originally a self-contained repository of interlanguage links. Wikipedia language editions were still not able to access Wikidata, so they needed to continue to maintain their own lists of interlanguage links.

On 14 January 2013, the Hungarian Wikipedia became the first to enable the provision of interlanguage links via Wikidata. This functionality was extended to the Hebrew and Italian Wikipedias on 30 January, to the English Wikipedia on 13 February and to all other Wikipedias on 6 March. After no consensus was reached over a proposal to restrict the removal of language links from the English Wikipedia, they were automatically removed by bots. On 23 September 2013, interlanguage links went live on Wikimedia Commons.

Statements and data access 
On 4 February 2013, statements were introduced to Wikidata entries. The possible values for properties were initially limited to two data types (items and images on Wikimedia Commons), with more data types (such as coordinates and dates) to follow later. The first new type, string, was deployed on 6 March.

The ability for the various language editions of Wikipedia to access data from Wikidata was rolled out progressively between 27 March and 25 April 2013. On 16 September 2015, Wikidata began allowing so-called arbitrary access, or access from a given article of a Wikipedia to the statements on Wikidata items not directly connected to it. For example, it became possible to read data about Germany from the Berlin article, which was not feasible before. On 27 April 2016 arbitrary access was activated on Wikimedia Commons.

According to a 2020 study, a large proportion of the data on Wikidata consists of entries imported en masse from other databases by Internet bots, which helps to "break down the walls" of data silos.

Query service and other improvements 
On 7 September 2015, the Wikimedia Foundation announced the release of the Wikidata Query Service, which lets users run queries on the data contained in Wikidata. The service uses SPARQL as the query language. As of November 2018, there are at least 26 different tools that allow querying the data in different ways. It uses Blazegraph as its triplestore and graph database.

In 2021 Wikimedia Deutschland released Wikidata:Query Builder, "a form-based query builder to allow people who don’t know how to use SPARQL to" write a query.

Logo 
The bars on the logo contain the word "WIKI" encoded in Morse code. It was created by Arun Ganesh and selected through community decision.

Reception 
In November 2014, Wikidata received the Open Data Publisher Award from the Open Data Institute "for sheer scale, and built-in openness".

In December 2014, Google announced that it would shut down Freebase in favor of Wikidata.

, Wikidata information was used in 58.4% of all English Wikipedia articles, mostly for external identifiers or coordinate locations. In aggregate, data from Wikidata is shown in 64% of all Wikipedias' pages, 93% of all Wikivoyage articles, 34% of all Wikiquotes', 32% of all Wikisources', and 27% of Wikimedia Commons's. Usage in other Wikimedia Foundation projects is a testimonial.

, Wikidata's data was visualized by at least 20 other external tools and over 300 papers have been published about Wikidata.

Wikidata's structured dataset has been used by virtual assistants such as Apple's Siri and Amazon Alexa.

Applications 
 Mwnci extension can import data from Wikidata to LibreOffice Calc spreadsheets
 There are (at October 2019) discussions about using QID items in relation to what is being called QID emoji
 Wiki Explorer – Android application to discover things around you and micro editing Wikidata
 KDE Itinerary – a privacy conscious open source travel assistant that uses data from Wikidata
 Google originally started a frame semantic parser project that aims to parse the information on Wikipedia and transfer it into Wikidata by coming up with relevant statements using artificial intelligence.

A systematic literature review of the uses of Wikidata in research was carried in 2019.

See also 

 Abstract Wikipedia
 BabelNet
 DBpedia
 Semantic MediaWiki
 Wikibase

References

Further reading 
 
 Claudia Müller-Birn, Benjamin Karran, Janette Lehmann, Markus Luczak-Rösch: Peer-production system or collaborative ontology development effort: What is Wikidata? In, OpenSym 2015 – Conference on Open Collaboration, San Francisco, US, 19 – 21 Aug 2015 (preprint).

External links 

 
 Videos: WikidataCon on media.ccc.de

 
Knowledge graphs
Online databases
Wikimedia projects
Lexical databases
Advertising-free websites
Creative Commons-licensed websites
Internet properties established in 2012
Articles containing video clips
Open data
Community websites